Thomas David Waddell (September 17, 1958 – September 14, 2019) was a Scottish Major League Baseball pitcher.

Waddell grew up in Closter, New Jersey and attended Northern Valley Regional High School at Demarest.

Baseball Career 
Hank Aaron was present at Waddell's tryout and credited with signing the young pitcher. After three seasons in their farm system, he was drafted by the Indians in the  rule 5 draft. He made his major league debut on April 15, 1984 against the Baltimore Orioles, facing only two batters and giving up a game tying sacrifice fly and a single. For the season, Waddell went 7–4 with a 3.06 earned run average, 59 strikeouts and six saves in 58 appearances for the Indians, setting a club record for relief appearances by a rookie.

In 1985, Waddell was 4–5 with a 3.88 ERA and nine saves out of the tribe's bullpen when Cleveland manager Pat Corrales converted him into a starter. In his first major league start, Waddell pitched six plus innings to earn the win over Ron Guidry and the New York Yankees. For the season, he made nine starts, including a 7-hit complete game win over Dave Stieb and the Toronto Blue Jays on August 19.

He was unsuccessful in a brief 1987 comeback bid, going 0–1 with a 14.29 ERA in six games with the Indians. He split the  season between the Expos' and Milwaukee Brewers' farm system before retiring.

Post-baseball career 
Waddell became a U.S. citizen in 1990. He held several corporate jobs in Texas and Arizona, including Intuit, the software company that developed Quickbooks and Turbo Tax. Waddell died of cancer in 2019.

References

External links

Tom Waddell at Baseball Almanac
Sports Illustrated
Tom Waddell at RIP Baseball

1958 births
2019 deaths
Northern Valley Regional High School at Demarest alumni

People from Closter, New Jersey
Scottish emigrants to the United States
Sportspeople from Dundee
Cleveland Indians players
Indianapolis Indians players
Major League Baseball pitchers
Major League Baseball players from the United Kingdom
Major League Baseball players from Scotland
Scottish baseball players
Manhattan Jaspers baseball players